Mario Valiante (31 August 1925 – 22 September 2018) was an Italian politician who was a Member of Parliament between 1958 and 1983.

References

1925 births
2018 deaths
Christian Democracy (Italy) members of the Chamber of Deputies (Italy)
Deputies of Legislature III of Italy
Deputies of Legislature IV of Italy
Deputies of Legislature V of Italy
Deputies of Legislature VI of Italy
Senators of Legislature VII of Italy
Senators of Legislature VIII of Italy
People from the Province of Salerno